Kamrul Islam is a Bangladeshi doctor who won the Independence Award in 2022 for his contribution to the field of medicine.

Biography 
Kamrul Islam's father Aminul Islam was an agronomist at the Pabna Sugarcane Research Center. Kamrul was the second of four siblings. He completed his secondary education from Chandraprabha Vidyapeeth, Pabna in 1980 and was ranked 15th in the merit list. He then passed higher secondary from Dhaka College in 1982. He passed MBBS from Dhaka Medical College. He later studied at the Royal College of Surgeons of Edinburgh for higher education. He joined the health cadre in 1993 through BCS. He also served as an assistant professor at the National Institute of Kidney Diseases & Urology Hospital. In 2007, he successfully performed a successful kidney transplant for the first time. He left government service in 2011 and established CKD Hospital. He is the father of three daughters.

Award 
 Independence Award (2022)

References 

Living people
Year of birth missing (living people)
Recipients of the Independence Day Award
Bangladeshi physicians
Dhaka Medical College alumni
Dhaka College alumni